The Orlando Mayhem is a football team in the Independent Women's Football League based in Orlando, Florida.  Home games are played on the campus of East Ridge High School in nearby Clermont.

From their inaugural season of 2002 until the middle of 2004, the Mayhem was known as the Orlando Starz.

Season-By-Season

|2002 || 4 || 1 || 0 || 2nd East Division || --
|-
|2003 || 1 || 8 || 0 || 3rd East South Atlantic || --
|-
| |-
|2004 || 2 || 6 || 0 || 3rd East South Atlantic || --
|-
| colspan="6" align="center" | Orlando Mayhem (IWFL)
|-
|2005 || 0 || 10 || 0 || 3rd East South Atlantic || --
|-
|2006 || 5 || 3 || 0 || 3rd East South Atlantic || --
|-
|2007 || 6 || 2 || 0 || 2nd East South Atlantic || --
|-
|2008 || 7 || 1 || 0 || 1st Tier II East South Atlantic || Lost Eastern Conference Semifinal (Pittsburgh)
|-
|2009 || 2 || 6 || 0 || 7th Tier II || --
|-
!Totals || 25 || 40 || 0
|colspan="2"| (including playoffs)

2009 season schedule

External links
 Orlando Mayhem official website
 IWFL official website

Independent Women's Football League
American football teams in Orlando, Florida
2002 establishments in Florida
Women in Florida